= Opinion polling for the 1957 Canadian federal election =

This article is about polls leading up to the 1957 Canadian federal election.

== During the 22rd Parliament of Canada ==
Evolution of voting intentions at national level
Polling firm	Last day of survey	Source	PC	LPC	CCF	SC	Other	ME	Sample
Election 1957	June 10, 1957		38.50	40.45	10.59	6.54	3.92		
Gallup	June 1957		34	48	10	7	1	—	—
Gallup	May 1957		33	47	11	8	1	—	—
Gallup	April 1957		32	47	11	—	10	—	—
Gallup	February 1957		32	49	10	—	9	—	—
Gallup	November 1956		31	50	10	—	9	—	—
Gallup	August 1956		31	47	13	—	9	—	—
Gallup	April 1956		29	50	12	—	9	—	—
Gallup	February 1956		31	47	12	—	10	—	—
Gallup	December 1955		32	46	13	—	9	—	—
Gallup	October 1956		31	47	13	—	9	—	—
Gallup	August 1955		28	49	14	—	9	—	—
Gallup	June 1955		25	51	14	—	9	—	—
Gallup	February 1955		29	51	12	—	8	—	—
Gallup	December 1954		27	50	12	—	9	—	—
Gallup	December 1953		27	53	12	—	8	—	—
Election 1953	August 10, 1953		31.02	48.43	11.28	5.40	3.87		

== Regional polling ==
=== Quebec ===
Evolution of voting intentions at national level
Polling firm	Last day of survey	Source	LPC	PC	CCF	Other	ME	Sample
Election 1957	June 10, 1957		56.8	30.7	1.8	10.7		
Gallup	May 1957		70	22	2	6	—	—
Gallup	April 1957		71	20	1	8	—	—
Gallup	February 1957		70	23	1	6	—	—
Election 1953	August 10, 1953		61.0	29.4	1.5	8.1		

=== Maritimes ===
Evolution of voting intentions at national level
Polling firm	Last day of survey	Source	LPC	PC	CCF	Other	ME	Sample
Gallup	May 1957		52	44	2	2	—	—
Gallup	April 1957		51	44	2	3	—	—
Gallup	February 1957		51	45	3	1	—	—

=== Ontario ===
Evolution of voting intentions at national level
Polling firm	Last day of survey	Source	PC	LPC	CCF	Other	ME	Sample
Election 1957	June 10, 1957		48.1	36.6	11.9	3.4		
Gallup	June 1957		45	43	11	1	—	—
Gallup	May 1957		48	40	11	1	—	—
Gallup	April 1957		47	42	10	1	—	—
Gallup	February 1957		41	47	10	2	—	—
Election 1953	August 10, 1953		40.3	46.0	11.1	2.6		

=== West ===
Evolution of voting intentions at national level
Polling firm	Last day of survey	Source	SC	CCF	PC	LPC	Other	ME	Sample
Election 1957	June 10, 1957		22.30	14.63	29.98	25.61	7.48		
Gallup	May 1957		24	22	19	34	1	—	—
Gallup	April 1957		—	24	20	32	24	—	—
Gallup	February 1957		—	22	21	34	23	—	—
